Matthew Quincy Daddario (born October 1, 1987) is an American actor. He is best known for his role as Alec Lightwood on the Freeform television series Shadowhunters (2016–2019). He is the younger brother of actress Alexandra Daddario.

Early life
Daddario was born and raised in New York City, the son of Christina Daddario, a lawyer, and Richard Daddario, a prosecutor and former head of NYPD Counterterrorism under Mayor Michael Bloomberg. His older sister is actress Alexandra Daddario.

Daddario's paternal grandfather was Emilio Q. Daddario, a Democratic representative to the United States House of Representatives for the state of Connecticut from 1959 to 1971. He is of Italian, English, Irish, Hungarian, and Slovak ancestry. Daddario attended the Collegiate School, before graduating with a degree in economics from Indiana University Bloomington in 2010.

Career
Daddario made his major film debut as Aaron in the romantic drama film Breathe In which was directed by Drake Doremus. In the same year he had a supporting role as Channing in the Vince Vaughn-led comedy film Delivery Man, directed by Ken Scott. In 2014, Daddario portrayed Danny Ladouceur in the sports drama film When the Game Stands Tall, co-starring alongside Jim Caviezel, Laura Dern, and Alexander Ludwig. The film is based on the achievements of football coach Bob Ladouceur and the De La Salle Spartans, who set a record 151-game winning streak.

In 2015, he co-starred as Gabriel in the teen comedy-drama Naomi and Ely's No Kiss List. In May 2015, it was announced that Daddario would portray Alec Lightwood on the Freeform fantasy series Shadowhunters, based on The Mortal Instruments series of novels by Cassandra Clare. He received a variety of nominations including Teen Choice Awards and GLAAD awards for his performance in the series. The show began airing on January 12, 2016 and ended on May 6, 2019. Also in 2016, he starred in the remake of Eli Roth's horror film Cabin Fever which was directed by Travis Z. In 2020, he joined the cast of Why Women Kill for the show's second season. He portrayed Scooter, a wannabe actor described as "charming but not so bright."

Personal life 
Daddario married Esther Kim on December 31, 2017. The couple announced via Instagram posts in May 2020 that they were expecting their first child. Their daughter was born in September 2020.

Filmography

Film

Television

Awards and nominations

References

External links

 
 

1987 births
Living people
Male actors from New York City
American people of Italian descent
American people of English descent
American people of Irish descent
American people of Hungarian descent
American people of Slovak descent
Indiana University Bloomington alumni
American male film actors
American male television actors
21st-century American male actors
Daddario family